Horst Walter (14 June 1936; Pankow, Berlin – 15 May 2012; Berlin) was a contemporary German artist.

Life 

Born in  Berlin during the Nazi regime, he grew up in the western part of the divided Berlin. He produced drawings and modern sculptures. In divided Berlin he protested against the Berlin Wall. After the Berlin Wall came down in 1989 he tried to remind the German public to keep parts of the Berlin Wall as a monument of memorial. To do this he started numberless performances in the so-called "No Man's Land" between the Potsdamer Platz and the Reichstag building.

Projects (examples) 

 1985: "Zeichen setzten" Performances at Berlin Wall
 1990: "Kulturprojekt Potsdamer Platz": Cafe 9.November at the former checkpoint Potsdamer Platz
 1990: Potsdamerplatz: Keep The Wall Project- 118 pieces of the Berlin Wall
 1991: Exhibition Voltaire in Potsdam
 1992: Retrospektive in Kunsthaus Tacheles
 1998: 1.place in the internationalen Mail-ART Kapos ART contest, Kaposvar; Mail Art. Hungary Budapest; Symposium. Barc Hungary
 2003: opening of Mauerspechtmuseum

References

External links
Horst Walter's website

1936 births
2012 deaths
20th-century German painters
20th-century German male artists
German male painters
21st-century German painters
21st-century German male artists
Artists from Berlin
People from Pankow